92 Squadron or 92nd Squadron may refer to:

 No. 92 Squadron RAF, a unit of the United Kingdom Royal Air Force 
 No. 92 Squadron RAAF, a unit of the Australian Royal Air Force